Meshchyorskaya, formerly Skolkovo and Vostryakovo, is a railway station of Kiyevsky suburban railway line in Western Administrative Okrug of Moscow. It was opened in 1899 and will be rebuilt.

Gallery

References

Railway stations in Moscow
Railway stations of Moscow Railway
Railway stations in the Russian Empire opened in 1899